is a Japanese actor. He has appeared in more than eighty films since 1996.

Selected filmography

Film

Television

References

External links
 

1962 births
Living people
People from Tokyo
Japanese male film actors
Japanese male television actors